Alberici is an Italian surname. Notable people with the surname include:

Augusto Alberici, 19th-century Italian painter and antiquarian
Emma Alberici (born 1970), Australian journalist
Nuvolone Alberici, 12th-century Italian diplomat and statesman of the early Republic of Genoa

Italian-language surnames